Dave Miller (born 1960) is an English male former track and road cyclist.

Cycling career
Miller is a three times British National champion, winning two titles on the road; 10 Mile time trial (1977) and Criterion (1985). He won his third title on the track at the British National Track Championships winning the British National Omnium Championships in 1987.

References

1960 births
British male cyclists
British track cyclists
Living people